Acraea excelsior is a butterfly in the family Nymphalidae. It is found in Kenya and Tanzania.

Description

A. excelsior E. Sharpe (56 a) nearly approaches the preceding species [ Acraea goetzei and is quite similarly marked above, but has the median band of the hindwing and the subapical band of the forewing light lemon-yellow and the hindmarginal spot of the fore wing also margined with light yellowish. The under surface of the hindwing only differs in having the marginal band deeper black without light lines on the veins, while the black basal and discal dots of cellules 1 a to 1 c form a red-spotted patch and those of cellules 5 to 7 a sharp, red-centred triangle. Nyassaland; German and British East Africa.

Subspecies
Acraea excelsior excelsior (central Kenya, southern Tanzania)
Acraea excelsior usambarae Jackson, 1951 (Tanzania: north-east to the Usambara Mountains)

Biology

The larvae feed on Triumfetta macrophylla.

Taxonomy
Acraea excelsior is a member of the Acraea bonasia species group; see Acraea.

See also Pierre & Bernaud, 2014

References

External links

 Images representing  Acraea excelsior usambarae at Bold
Die Gross-Schmetterlinge der Erde 13: Die Afrikanischen Tagfalter. Plate XIII 56 a

Butterflies described in 1891
excelsior
Butterflies of Africa